Hyde Park High School is a public co-educational secondary school that is in Hyde Park, Johannesburg, South Africa. Although Hyde Park High School is a government school, falling under the Gauteng Department of Education, it offers a matriculation qualification from the IEB (Independent Education Board). This makes Hyde Park High School rather unusual in that it offers the same type of qualification as a private school but retains the status and culture of a government school.

Current Principal 

The current principal of Hyde Park High School is Mrs. M Kallie.

Academics 
The academic subjects being offered each year include:

 Accounting
 Afrikaans
 Art
 Information technology
 CAT(Computer Applications Technology) 
 EGD (Engineer & graphic design)
 English
 Geography
 History
 Life orientation
 Life science
 Mathematics
 Mathematical literacy
 Physical science
 isiZulu

Extracurricular activities

Extracurricular activities at Hyde park: 

Summer sports:
 Cricket
 Squash
 Swimming
 Water Polo
 Tennis

Winter sports: 
 Athletics
 Cross country
 Soccer
 Hockey
 Rugby
 Squash
 Tennis

Cultural activities

Activities offered:
 Backstage
 Debating
 Drama
 Dramatics - Music 
 First Aid
 Interact
 Public speaking
 Sound and lighting 
 Valentines Ball
 Winter Ball

Rivals of the school include:
 Fourways High School
 Bryanston High School
 Edenvale High School

School Terms

School terms at Hyde Park are usually 2-2 and a half months long, with four terms a year.
Consisting from 190 - 205 school days a year.

References

External links
 Hyde Park High School official website

Schools in Johannesburg
Educational institutions established in 1957
1957 establishments in South Africa